Zhmerynka is a city in Vinnytsia Oblast (province) of central Ukraine. Serving as the administrative center of the Zhmerynka Raion (district), the town itself is not a part of the district and is separately incorporated as a city of oblast significance. Population:

Name
There are many propositions as far as the origin of name of Zhmerynka is concerned. One of the ideas is that it may be derived from the Polish words, describing the handshake.

History

Ancient time
Zhmerynka was established as a city in agreement with the Magdeburg rights in 1591. Before that moment, the two villages: Big Zhmerynka village and Small Zhmerynka village, were known to exist at the same place in 16th century.

Some time later, Zmerynka was shortly described in a book titled: "Geographic Dictionary of Polish Kingdom and other Slavic places," published in Warsaw in Poland.

World War II period
Zhmerynka was occupied by the Romanian Army during the Second World War from 17 July 1941 until 20 March 1944 and incorporated into the Transnistria Governorate.

Geography

Location
Zhmerynka is situated in a South-Eastern part of the Vinnytsia region. Zmerynka has an area of 18,2 square kilometers. The average altitude above the sea level is 326m.

Climate
Zhmerynka has the continental European climate.

City governance
The Mayor of Zhmerynka is elected by the people of Zhmerynka during the direct election process.

The City Assembly may approve or reject the urban development decrees, initiated by the local people, social groups and organizations.

Religion

Orthodox religion
The old Orthodox Cathedral was built in 1893, however it was destroyed in 1928.

There is the newly built St. Oleksandr Nevs'ky Orthodox Cathedral, which was made of the red bricks in 2005, in a central part of the city of Zhmerynka.

Catholic religion
There is the St. Oleksiy Catholic Cathedral, which was built in 1910, in Zhmerynka (see the picture in the Gallery).

Jewish religion
Many Jewish people were in Zhmerynka before World War II. However, the Synagogue was destroyed during the World War II. Presently, the Jewish people initiated an effort to collect the financial funds to build a new Synagogue in Zhmerynka.

Economy

Railway industry
The railway company, which is a part of railway transportation industry, is a biggest business and employer in Zhmerynka.

Agriculture industry
There are many companies, which belong to the agricultural industry in Zhmerynka.

Food industry
There is a well developed food processing industry with a number of big, medium and small companies.

Education industry
There are many secondary schools in Zhmerynka, which employ a big number of teachers.

Tourism industry
There is a number of comfortable hotels with a variety of services, which operate in Zhmerynka.

Transportation

Railway transportation

Zhmation hub in Ukraine at present time.

The initial project of the Zmerynka railway transportation hub was made by Carl von Mekk, engineer in 1865.

The building of the Zmerynka big railway station was designed by Zhuravs'ky, architect and it was built in 1899–1904.

Zmerynka railway station was fully renovated in 2012.

Automobile transportation
There is a bus station near the railway station.

Media

Printing media
Zhmerins'ky Meridian newspaper is published in Zhmerynka. The head office is located at Bohdan Khmelnits'ky Street 19, Zhmerynka 23100, Ukraine.

Electronic media
There is an FM radio-station: "Obriy", which transmits the local news and the music in Zhmerynka at 67.34 MHz.

Internet media
There is a number of Internet resources, which monitor the cultural, business, politics news in Zhmerynka.

Notable people
 Jan Brzechwa, Polish poet and writer.
 Valery Brezdenyuk, painter.
 Denis Forov, retired Armenian Greco-Roman wrestler
 Izrail Gelman, Math Teacher, Holocaust Survivor

Gallery

Twin towns – brother cities
Zhmerynka is twinned with:
  Shaki, Azerbaijan
  Skarżysko-Kamienna, Poland
  Sędziszów Małopolski, Poland

References

External links
 Site about Zhmerynka
 Unofficial site

 
Cities in Vinnytsia Oblast
Cities of regional significance in Ukraine
Articles containing video clips
Railway towns in Ukraine
Vinnitsky Uyezd
Shtetls
Holocaust locations in Ukraine